Peter Ellis (born 30 May 1936) is an English actor. Ellis has worked extensively in theatre and television both as an actor and director. He spent four seasons with the Royal Shakespeare Company, as well as spending five years at the Crucible Theatre in Sheffield, and three years with the Old Vic Company which included playing Benvolio in Zeffirelli's Romeo and Juliet, Hotspur in Henry IV, Part 1 and later Rosencrantz in a world tour of Hamlet starring Derek Jacobi. He also played Guildenstern in Hamlet on the site of the new Globe Theatre, 

In the West End he appeared in The Tulip Tree  and in Ray Cooney's Funny Money.  He is perhaps best known for playing the role of Chief Superintendent Charles Brownlow in the long running ITV drama The Bill. Has also appeared as a semi-regular in Emmerdale Farm and Coronation Street. Other series include Sam Lyttons Diary, Edward and Mrs Simpson, The XYY Man, Nolan, The Les Dawson Show, Victoria Wood's play Talent for Granada and Acorn Antiques for BBC TV. He appeared in the David Mercer television play In Two Minds (1967), a work which was directed by Ken Loach. Ellis also appeared as a Jury Foreman in Granada Television’s daytime legal drama series Crown Court, the case of Regina v Vennings & Vennings.

In 1981 Ellis appeared as a police officer in Trafalgar Square in the horror film An American Werewolf in London. In 1983, he appeared in the play Trafford Tanzi, starring Toyah Willcox, at the Mermaid Theatre in London.

Ellis was a regular cast member of The Bill from the first series in 1984 until 2000 when he left the series. His last episode was written by his son Hugh Ellis who went on to write the award-winning feature Summer starring Robert Carlyle. However he did return to The Bill in 2002 for a guest appearance. He also appeared in Hugh's film The Mortician's Tea Party playing Jed.

Ellis played the title role in The Mikado, Carl Rosa's opera tour of Australia.

Ellis played Mr Bennet opposite Susan Hampshire in Bath Theatre tour of Pride and Prejudice, Sorin in the Bristol Old Vic production of The Seagull.
More recently Ellis directed his wife Anita Parry in the comedy drama What Would Helen Mirren Do? for the Edinburgh Festival 2010.

In 2011 he played Adam/Corin in Shakespeare's As You Like It at the Royal Exchange Theatre, Manchester. Ellis has also appeared in Hindle Wakes at the Finbourgh Theatre.

In 2018, Ellis starred in For King & Country at the Southwark Playhouse.

Career
Recent theatre:
 Mr Bennett - in Pride & Prejudice for Bath Theatre Royal and tour
 Sorin - The Seagull, Bristol Old Vic
 Gracechurch in Topless Mum at the Tobacco Factory, Bristol
 The Magistrate in Puntilla and his man Mattie - Coventry Belgrade Theatre,
 The Muralist in The Hidden City - Part Exchange Theatre, Plymouth
 Director - Fen, Cygnet New Theatre, Exeter

Television includes:
 The Bill (16 years playing Chief Superintendent Brownlow)
 Lytton's Diary
 Acorn Antiques
 Talent
 In Two Minds
 First Amongst Equals
 Sam
Other theatre: West End
 Trafford Tanzi
 Funny Money - Ray Cooney
 The Tulip Tree

Old Vic (4 seasons)
RSC (4 seasons)
Crucible, Sheffield (5 seasons)
West Yorkshire Playhouse, Leeds 
Birmingham Rep
Nottingham Playhouse

Tours with:
Prospect
Belt and Braces
Temba

Worked extensively in radio mainly for BBC Radio 4

In 2012, he toured the UK in a production of The Cemetery Club alongside Anne Charleston, Anita Harris and Shirley-Anne Field

References

External links
 
 

1936 births
Living people
English male film actors
English male television actors